Trapdoor Inc. was a Canadian video game developer based in Montreal. Founded in August 2008 by Ken Schachter, the company developed Warp and co-published Polytron Corporation's Fez, both released in 2012. A third title, Heist, was cancelled after six months in development before Trapdoor was shut down in December 2012.

History 
Trapdoor was established in August 2008 by Ken Schachter, formerly the chief technology officer for American Apparel and later the studio manager of Gameloft Montreal. By October that year, the company had hired Alex Charbonneau, a former game designer for Gameloft Montreal and Ubisoft Montreal, as lead game designer. Trapdoor stated that it would strictly follow the International Game Developers Association's developer crediting standard. Trapdoor's first game would be an original intellectual property for personal computers, PlayStation 3, and Xbox 360. By May 2011, Trapdoor employed 15 people, with Schachter managing the studio.

In November 2010, Electronic Arts' EA Partners announced a publishing deal with Trapdoor for the game Warp. The game was released for Xbox 360 in February 2012, as well as for Windows and PlayStation 3 the following March. Trapdoor announced in March 2011 that it would co-publish the Polytron Corporation-developed game Fez, which was released in April 2012 for Xbox 360. A third title, codenamed Heist, entered production in early 2012 but was cancelled six months into development. Trapdoor was disestablished on 16 December 2012.

Games 
 Warp (2012)
 Fez (2012)
 Heist (cancelled)

References 

Companies based in Montreal
Defunct companies of Quebec
Defunct video game companies of Canada
Video game companies disestablished in 2012
Video game companies established in 2008
Video game development companies